Pauchi Kamuy is the Ainu kamuy (god) of insanity.

Mythology
In Ainu mythology, Pauchi Kamuy is an evil spirit born from the Willow-Soul River in Pikun Kando (High Heaven).  It descended to earth to plague humanity with insanity, stomach ailments, food poisoning, seizures, and frenzied dancing.  Epidemics of the latter were said to have wiped out several villages in the late 19th century.

Notes

References
Ashkenazy, Michael. Handbook of Japanese Mythology. Santa Barbara, California: ABC-Clio, 2003.
Etter, Carl. Ainu Folklore: Traditions and Culture of the Vanishing Aborigines of Japan. Chicago: Wilcox and Follett, 1949.
Munro, Neil Gordon. Ainu Creed and Cult. New York: Columbia University Press, 1995.

Ainu kamuy